Chilgok County (Chilgok-gun) is located at south-west part of North Gyeongsang Province. It is close by Gunwi County, Daegu Metropolitan city on the east while adjoins with Gimchon-si, Seongju County on the west. It is also a transportation hub where the Nakdong river flows through and an Urban-Farming complex that adjoins with Gumi City and Daegu Metropolitan city.

It is home to the famous Cheonsaengsanseong Fortress, a battle field where general Gwak Jae-woo fought during the Japanese Invasion of Korea in 1592, as well as the Gasansanseong Fortress, which was built to prevent a Japanese invasion after the second Manchu invasions in 1636. It is also a battle field of the Nakdong River and Dabudong battles during the Korean war.

History

Silla Period 
It was Palgeorihyeon or Bukchijangnihyeon, Illihyeon and King Gyeongdeok of Silla (the 35th ruler who reigned from 742 to 765 over the kingdom of Silla) revised it to Pal-ri of which become affiliated to Suchang-guen.

Goryeo Period 
It was revised to Palgeo in the early part of Goryeo period and during King Hyeonjong of Goryeo (the 8th ruler who reigned from 1010-1031), it become affiliation of Gyonsanbu which is the present lord of the castle.

Joseon Period 
In 1640 when King Injo of Joseon (the 16th ruler who reigned from 1623-1649) reign for 18th year, it was called Chilgok by installing regional military command and Gasansanseong Fortress. In 1895 King Gojong's (the 26th ruler who reigned from 1863-1907) 32nd year of reign, Chilgok was re-entitled to Chilgok-guen which led to become a part of Daegu. In accordance with rearrangement of Buguen-myeon in 1914, it incorporated with 9 myeon of Indong-guen , Yakmok-myeon which used to be Daemok or ChilchonㆍGonsanhyeon during Silla dynasty and transferred the location of the county to Waegwan.

Geography and climate
Its geographical coordinate is 128°18'-128°38'to the east longitude and the north latitude 35°52' - 36°38' with average temperature of 14.8°C and 948mm amount of rainfall.

Administrative divisions 

Chilgok County is divided into 3 eup and 5 myeon.

Tourism

Gasansanseong Fortress

Gasansanseong Camping Site

Dabudong War Memorial Museum

Songjeong Recreational Forest

Chilgokbo Auto-camping Site

Chilgok Patriots & Peace Memorial 
Chilgok Patriots & Peace Memorial is a memorial museum dedicated to the soldiers who seized victory by holding up a fierce battle at Nakdong River's line of defense for 55 days in Chilgok during the Korean War. The museum consists of a spacious four-story high building with two basement floors and an outdoor exhibition with a variety of artifacts. The museum also has battle miniatures and experience facilities to help foster patriotism and appreciation for the soldiers who gave their lives to protect the country. 3.

References

External links
County government website
Cheonsaengsanseong Fortresss
Gasansanseong Fortress

 
Counties of North Gyeongsang Province